Callum Casey (born 6 June 1990) is a professional rugby league footballer who has played in the 2010s. He has played at representative level for Ireland, and at club level for the Leeds Rhinos (Academy and Reserves), on loan from the Leeds Rhinos for Oldham (Heritage No. 1284) (loan), Halifax (Heritage No. 1303), in the Kingstone Press Championship One for Hunslet Hawks (Heritage No.)

Background
Callum Casey is the son of the rugby league footballer; Leo Casey.

References

External links
(archived by web.archive.org) Hunslet Hawks profile

1990 births
Living people
Batley Bulldogs players
English rugby league players
Halifax R.L.F.C. players
Hunslet R.L.F.C. players
Ireland national rugby league team players
Oldham R.L.F.C. players
Oxford Rugby League players
Place of birth missing (living people)
Rugby league five-eighths
Rugby league hookers
Rugby league locks
Rugby league second-rows